Al-Balawi can refer to:

 al-Balawi, an Egyptian historian
 Hakam Balawi, Palestinian politician
 Humam Khalil Abu-Mulal al-Balawi, Jordanian doctor and a triple agent suicide bomber 
 Mansour al-Balawi, Saudi Arabian businessman
 The nisba of a member of the Arab tribe of Bali

Arabic-language surnames